The Diocese of Ysabel is one of the nine current dioceses of the Anglican Church of Melanesia.

It is one of the four original founding dioceses of the Church, erected in 1975 and inaugurated on 1 March 1975 at Jejevo Primary School. The diocese is now divided into four regions and 28 districts or parishes and is based in Jejevo, Buala, a town in the Solomon Islands located on Santa Isabel Island.

List of bishops

References

Sources
Anglican Church of Melanesia — Diocese of Ysabel

 
Ysabel, Diocese of
Melanesia
Christian organizations established in 1975
1975 establishments in Oceania